Mary E. Galvin is an American scientist and the former Dean of the University of Notre Dame College of Science. She earned her BA in chemistry at Manhattanville College and her MSc and PhD degrees in polymers and materials science at the Massachusetts Institute of Technology. Galvin worked at Bell Laboratories following the completion of her doctorate work until 1998, when she joined the faculty at the University of Delaware. In 2005, Galvin entered the private sector as a technical lead in new technology development at Air Products and Chemicals, Inc. In 2013, she became the director of the Materials Science division at the National Science Foundation, and then in 2015 began as the dean of the Notre Dame College of Science.

Mary Galvin was named a fellow of the American Physical Society in 1999 and is an elected fellow of the Materials Research Society. From 2008 until 2009, she served on the board for the Materials Research Society. She served on the Advisory Council for the Gordon Research Conferences from 2001 to 2003

References 

American materials scientists
Manhattanville College alumni
MIT School of Engineering alumni
University of Notre Dame faculty
Scientists from New York (state)

Year of birth missing (living people)
Living people